Public Joint Stock Company Dongorbank is headquartered in Donetsk, located in eastern Ukraine.

History

The bank was established with the National Bank of Ukraine as Donetsk Joint Stock Bank Aktseptbank on 6 April 1992.  
In July 1995 the bank was renamed into Donetsk Joint Stock Bank DONGORBANK by the decision of the general meeting of shareholders. 
In December 2010, Central bank of Ukraine approved a reorganization plan through Dongorbank's joining the FUIB - the First International Bank of Ukraine, which was endorsed by an order of a single shareholder - SCM Finance Limited. On July 16, 2011, a consolidation of First Ukrainian International Bank (FUIB) and Dongorbank was completed and starting from July 18 the combined bank actives work under a joint brand FUIB.

Ratings

25 January 2011 - Moody's Investors Service has assigned the following global scale ratings to JSC Dongorbank:

 short-term national currency deposit       B2/NP
 short-term foreign currency deposit        B3/NP
 financial strength                         E+
 local currency debt obligations            B2
 long-term national scale rating            A3.ua
                                  
As of 1 June 2010 in the overall ranking of Ukrainian banks Dongorbank ranked:

 23rd by the size of assets with UAH 8,797m
 26th by the size of shareholders' equity with UAH 1,058m;
 23rd by the volume of retail deposits with UAH 2,491m;
 15th by the size of deposits held by corporations  with UAH 2,977m.

The Bank major shareholder is SCМ Finance LLC (99.99% of the share capital). Bank regional network comprises 54 sub-branches.

References

External links 
 Dongorbank official website
 FUIB official website

Defunct banks of Ukraine